Carlos Urbizo Solís (born 22 November 1943) is a Honduran politician and businessman. He was a candidate to the Vice-Presidency for the National Party.

Life
Urbizo was born on 22 November 1943 in La Ceiba. He attended St Johns College de Belice and subsequently moved to the United States to study finance at Franklin & Marshall College. Urbizo then started working for PriceWaterHouse in Honduras and the United States.

In 1995, with fellow economist Carlos Gabriel Kattán being asked to become involved for the National Party of Honduras, Urbizo was asked to join the political movement of Nora Gúnera de Melgar.

In 2007 he denied having bank accounts with debts and having given political favours to banks, he declared this after having appeared on a list of people allegedly having done so.

In 2009 he supported the rule of President Roberto Micheletti, who was internationally unrecognized, and supported the legal measures against former President Manuel Zelaya.

Urbizo regards the issue of poverty in Honduras related to the political and economic system. Which he views as anti-democratic and anti-capitalistic. In 2014 he complained over business opportunities in Honduras, laying the blame with corrupt politicians.

References

1943 births
Living people
Honduran businesspeople
Honduran economists
Honduran politicians
National Party of Honduras politicians
People from La Ceiba